FC Stavropol was a Russian football club from Stavropol, founded in 2005. It was playing on the amateur level since its founding until 2008, when FC Stavropol came 2nd in the South zone of the Amateur Football League and advanced to the Russian Second Division. In February 2010, FC Stavropol dropped out of the Russian Second Division for financial reasons.

External links
Official Website

References

Association football clubs established in 2005
Association football clubs disestablished in 2010
Defunct football clubs in Russia
Sport in Stavropol
2005 establishments in Russia
2010 disestablishments in Russia